Mama's Affair may refer to:
 Mama's Affair (1921 film), an American silent romantic comedy film
 Mama's Affair (2022 film), a Hong Kong drama film